Hypericum swinkianum, known as Swink's St. John's wort, is a shrub in the St. John's wort family. It was named after Chicago Region botanist Floyd Swink (1921-2000).

Description
It has exfoliating bark. The flowers are produced in terminal flowerheads known as dichasia. Each dichasium produces 7-31 bright yellow flowers, each with 5 petals and numerous yellow stamens. The capsules are 5-parted. In the Chicago Region, it blooms between July and August.

Hypericum swinkianum differs from the closely related Hypericum kalmianum by its notably larger vegetative features, flowerheads each averaging more than 7 flowers, and an affinity toward acidic rather than calcareous habitats.

Distribution and habitat
Swink's St. Johns wort is known to occur in sand flatwoods and acidic wet to wet-mesic sand prairies in the western Great Lakes region in the United States, including Illinois, Indiana, and Michigan. It is a highly conservative species with a coefficient of conservatism of 10 in the Chicago Region and in Michigan.

References

swinkianum
Plants described in 2016